The Bethlehem Line was a SEPTA Regional Rail service on the former Reading Company Bethlehem Branch between Lansdale and Bethlehem, Pennsylvania. Some trains continued over the electrified Lansdale/Doylestown Line to the Reading Terminal in Philadelphia. 

Between 1978–79 SEPTA extended service to Allentown. Service ended altogether in 1981 as SEPTA eliminated its former Reading diesel services. The Bethlehem Line is  owned by SEPTA and is utilized for freight service by the Pennsylvania Northeastern Railroad between Lansdale and Telford and the East Penn Railroad between Telford and Quakertown. The Quakertown–Bethlehem section has been dormant since the early 1990s: several portions of the rail bed currently serve as the interim rail trails. It is not officially abandoned.

History 

The route between Philadelphia and Bethlehem was constructed in the 19th century by the North Pennsylvania Railroad, a forerunner of the Reading Company. The Reading continued to operate passenger services between the two cities into the 20th century; at one time Bethlehem was a major interchange with the Lehigh Valley Railroad and the Central Railroad of New Jersey. Commuter services survived into the Conrail era but fell victim to SEPTA's decision in 1981 to eliminate diesel services. Service between Bethlehem and Quakertown ended on July 1, 1981; service between Quakertown and Lansdale followed on July 26.

Stations 
Bethlehem trains made the following station stops; stations indicated with italics closed prior to the discontinuation of service in 1981. Mileage and fare zones are from the July 30, 1978 timetable.

References

External links 
 2006 restoration plan

Reading Company lines
Railway services discontinued in 1981
SEPTA Regional Rail